The heats for the Women's 800 m Freestyle race at the 2009 World Championships took place on the morning of 31 July and the final will take place in the evening session of 1 August at the Foro Italico in Rome, Italy.

Records
Prior to this competition, the existing world and competition records were as follows:

The following records were established during the competition:

Heats
According to Omega Timing, the heat results were:

Final
According to Omega Timing, the final results were:

References

Freestyle Women's 800 m
2009 in women's swimming